Lost Worlds is a collection of fantasy, horror and science fiction short stories by the American writer Clark Ashton Smith. It was published in 1944 and was the author's second book published by Arkham House. 2,043 copies were printed.

The stories for this volume were selected by the author. The collection contains stories from Smith's major story cycles of Hyperborea, Atlantis, Averoigne, Zothique and Xiccarph.

Contents
 "The Tale of Satampra Zeiros"
 "The Door to Saturn"
 "The Seven Geases"
 "The Coming of the White Worm"
 "The Last Incantation"
 "A Voyage to Sfanomoë"
 "The Death of Malygris"
 "The Holiness of Azédarac"
 "The Beast of Averoigne"
 "The Empire of the Necromancers"
 "The Isle of the Torturers"
 "Necromancy in Naat"
 "Xeethra"
 "The Maze of Maal Dweb"
 "The Flower-Women"
 "The Demon of the Flower"
 "The Plutonian Drug"
 "The Planet of the Dead"
 "The Gorgon"
 "The Letter from Mohaun Los"
 "The Light from Beyond"
 "The Hunters from Beyond"
 "The Treader of the Dust"

Reception
In the 2005 book Horror: Another 100 Best Books, the author Storm Constantine remarked that "they come across as slightly camp now, but still with the power to captivate". In the 1991 book The Science-Fantasy Publishers: A Critical and Bibliographic History, the authors Jack L. Chalker and Mark Owings noted "superb stories". The New York Times reviewer Marjorie Farber declared, "What is most fascinating about the present volume is the sort of obfuscatory prose which readers of Weird Tales, etc. are apparently willing to overcome for the sake of getting at whatever terror may lie at the end of the skull-dotted trail," concluding that Lost Worlds "cannot be read." In the 1989 book The Arkham House Companion: Fifty Years of Arkham House, the author Sheldon Jaffery compared it with Out of Space and Time and decided "the quality is slightly diminished". Black Gates Robert Burke Richardson wrote, "In Lost Worlds, the condition of an uncaring universe becomes not a case for despair, but rather for a weird and precious celebration."

Reprints
Jersey, Channel Islands: Neville Spearman, 1971.
St. Albans, UK: Panther, 1974 (2 vols.).
Lincoln, NE: Bison, 2006.

See also
 Clark Ashton Smith bibliography

References

Sources

1944 short story collections
Fantasy short story collections
Horror short story collections
Science fiction short story collections by Clark Ashton Smith